Cougar Fork is a stream in the U.S. state of West Virginia.

Cougar Fork may derive its name from John R. Cogar, an early settler.

See also
List of rivers of West Virginia

References

Rivers of Webster County, West Virginia
Rivers of West Virginia